Nola confusalis, the least black arches, is a moth of the family Nolidae. It is found in most of Europe, east to eastern Asia and Japan.

The wingspan is 16–18 mm. Adults are on wing from mid April to mid June in one generation in western Europe.

The larvae mainly feed on various deciduous trees and bushes, including lime (Tilia species) and evergreen oak (Quercus ilex). Larvae can be found from June to August. Pupation takes place in a cocoon attached to the host plant. The species overwinters in the pupal stage.

References

External links
 Lepidoptera of Belgium

confusalis
Moths described in 1847
Moths of Asia
Moths of Europe
Moths of Japan
Taxa named by Gottlieb August Wilhelm Herrich-Schäffer